Montecchio is a comune (municipality) in the Province of Terni in the Italian region Umbria, located about 50 km south of Perugia and about 30 km northwest of Terni.

Montecchio borders the following municipalities: Avigliano Umbro, Baschi, Civitella d'Agliano, Guardea, Orvieto, Todi.

The production facilities of the Falesco winery are located there.

Demographic evolution

Religious Buildings
Among the noteworthy religious buildings in the city are:
 Church of San Donnino Martire
 Sanctuary of the Beata Vergine dell'Olmo
 Church of the Madonna del Popolo (Chiesa Nuova)

References

Cities and towns in Umbria